Sony Kuriakose Cheruvathur (born 26 August 1978) is a former Indian cricketer who played for Kerala in domestic cricket. He is an all-rounder who plays as a right-handed middle order batsman and right arm medium-fast bowler.
 
He made his List A debut in the 2001/02 season. He made his first-class debut for Kerala on 15 November 2003 in the 2003-04 Ranji Trophy against Railways. He made his Twenty20 debut for Kerala in the 2006-07 Inter-state Twenty-20 tournament on 3 April 2007 against Karnataka.

He has led Kerala in the 2007, 2008 and 2012 seasons of Ranji Trophy. He is the fastest player to take 100 wickets for Kerala and the only second Kerala player to take a hat-trick after S Sreesanth.

References

External links

1978 births
Living people
Indian cricketers
Kerala cricketers
Cricketers from Kerala